Aesculus indica, commonly known as the Indian horse-chestnut or Himalayan horse chestnut, is a species of deciduous broad-leaved tree in the family Sapindaceae.

Description
It is in flower from June to July, and the seeds ripen in October. The flowers are hermaphroditic and with plentiful white blossoms during May and June pollinated by bees.

Distribution
It is common along the Himalayan Lowlands, between Kashmir and Western Nepal at elevations between 900 and 3,000 metres. In the British Isles it is popular in many parks and estates where it was introduced in the mid-19th century. It is also found in many parts of the US. The commercial collection of its seeds for flour production seems to have impacted on the natural distribution of this species.

Uses
Its leaves are used as cattle fodder in parts of Northern India. Its seeds are dried and ground into a bitter flour, called tattawakher. The bitterness is caused by saponins, which are rinsed out by thoroughly washing the flour during its preparation. The flour is often mixed with wheat flour to make chapatis and also to make a halwa (Indian sweetmeat) and sometimes is served as a dalia, (a type of porridge or gruel) during fasting periods.

It is used in traditional Indian medicine, for the treatment of some skin diseases, rheumatism, as an astringent, acrid and narcotic, and in the relief of headaches.

Its large leaves and flowers make it suitable for use as large-sized bonsai.

In the UK, the cultivar ‘Sydney Pearce’’ has gained the Royal Horticultural Society’s Award of Garden Merit.

References

External links

indica
Plants used in bonsai
Flora of Afghanistan
Flora of the Indian subcontinent
Medicinal plants of Asia
Ornamental trees
Garden plants of Europe